

Kurt Andersen (2 October 1898 – 9 January 2003) was a general in the Luftwaffe of Nazi Germany during World War II and in the Bundesgrenzschutz of West Germany. He was also a recipient of the Knight's Cross of the Iron Cross.

Awards and decorations

 Clasp to the Iron Cross (1939) 2nd Class (22 September 1939) & 1st Class (3 May 1940)
 Ground Assault Badge of the Luftwaffe (24 December 1942)
 Knight's Cross of the Iron Cross on 23 December 1942 as Oberst and commander of Flak-Regiment 153
 Grand Cross of the Order of Merit of the Federal Republic of Germany (Großes Verdienstkreuz des Verdienstordens der Bundesrepublik Deutschland) 1961

References

Citations

Bibliography

 
 

1898 births
2003 deaths
People from Salzgitter
People from the Province of Hanover
German police chiefs
German Army personnel of World War I
Luftwaffe World War II generals
Recipients of the clasp to the Iron Cross, 1st class
Recipients of the Knight's Cross of the Iron Cross
Commanders Crosses of the Order of Merit of the Federal Republic of Germany
German prisoners of war in World War II held by the United Kingdom
20th-century Freikorps personnel
German centenarians
Men centenarians
Major generals of the Luftwaffe
Military personnel from Lower Saxony